Obutobea is a monotypic snout moth genus. Its only species, Obutobea chrysophora, was described by Jean Ghesquière in 1942, and is known from the Democratic Republic of the Congo.

References

Moths described in 1942
Epipaschiinae
Monotypic moth genera
Moths of Africa
Pyralidae genera